Alan Howard (1931–2003) was an American ballet dancer, choreographer and teacher. He was a lead dancer for the Ballet Russe de Monte Carlo.

Biography

Early life
Alan Howard in 1931 in Chicago, Illinois. He learned ballet from Edna McRae.

Career
He became a dancer for the Ballet Russe de Monte Carlo in 1949, soon becoming lead dancer, or premier danseur. He left the company in 1960. He was later a dancer for the Mia Slavenska Ballet, the New York City Ballet, and the Radio City Music Hall.

He established the Pacific Ballet Academy in San Francisco, California. He choreographed and produced the Pacific Ballet. He also taught ballet. For example, Kyra Nichols, a lead dancer at the New York City Ballet, was one of his students.

In 2005, he appeared in the documentary, ''Ballets Russes.

Death
He died of cancer on March 6, 2003, in Chicago.

References

External links 

 Alan Howard Papers at Newberry Library

1931 births
2003 deaths
People from Chicago
People from San Francisco
American male ballet dancers
American choreographers
Deaths from cancer in Illinois
20th-century American ballet dancers